Isturgia is a genus of moths in the family Geometridae described by Jacob Hübner in 1823.

Description
Palpi hairy and reaching beyond the frons. Hind tibia not dilated. Wings with evenly curved outer margin. Forewings of male usually with fovea. Vein 3 from angle of cell. Vein 7 to 9 stalked from upper angle and vein 10 absent. Vein 11 usually free. Hindwings with vein 3 from angle of cell. In the typical section of male has the branches of antennae very short.

Species

 Isturgia arenacearia (Denis & Schiffermüller, 1775)
 Isturgia arenularia (Mabille, 1880)
 Isturgia assimilaria (Rambur, 1833)
 Isturgia arizeloides Krüger, 2001
 Isturgia berytaria (Staudinger, 1892)
 Isturgia catalaunaria (Guenée, 1857)
 Isturgia contexta (Saalmüller, 1891)
 Isturgia deerraria (Walker, 1861)
 Isturgia disputaria (Guenée, 1858)
 Isturgia dislocaria (Packard, 1876)
 Isturgia dukuduku Krüger, 2001
 Isturgia exerraria (Prout, 1925)
 Isturgia exospilata (Walker, 1861)
 Isturgia famula (Esper, 1787)
 Isturgia geminata (Warren, 1897)
 Isturgia hopfferaria Staudinger, 1878
 Isturgia inconspicuaria (Hübner, 1819)
 Isturgia kaszabi (Vojnits, 1974)
 Isturgia limbaria (Fabricius, 1775)
 Isturgia malesignaria (Mabille, 1880)
 Isturgia miniosaria (Duponchel, 1829)
 Isturgia modestaria (Pagenstecher, 1907)
 Isturgia murinaria (Denis & Schiffermüller, 1775)
 Isturgia penthearia Guenée, 1857
 Isturgia perplexa Krüger, 2001
 Isturgia pulinda (Walker, 1860)
 Isturgia pumicaria (Lederer, 1855)
 Isturgia roraria (Fabricius, 1776)
 Isturgia rubrior (Hausmann, 1990)
 Isturgia spissata (Walker, 1862)
 Isturgia spodiaria (Lefèbvre, 1832)
 Isturgia supergressa (Prout 1913)
 Isturgia tennoa (Pinker, 1978)
 Isturgia univirgaria (Mabille, 1880)

References

Macariini